Emperor Shun was a legendary leader of ancient China, regarded by some sources as one of the Three Sovereigns and Five Emperors being the last of the Five Emperors. Tradition holds that he lived sometime between 2294 and 2184 BC. Tradition also holds that those with surname Chen (陳) are descendants of Emperor Shun. The Duke Hu of Chen, a descendant of Shun, became the founder of the State of Chen. Later Chen dynasty emperors such as Chen Baxian would also claim descent from Shun.

Names
Shun's clan name is Yao, his lineage name is Youyu. His given name was Chonghua. Shun is sometimes referred to as the Great Shun or as Yu Shun or Shun of Yu, "Yu" being the name of his fief, which he received from Yao.

Life of Shun
According to traditional sources, Shun received the mantle of leadership from Emperor Yao at the age of 53, and then died at the age of 100 years. Before his death Shun is recorded as relinquishing his seat of power to Yu, the founder of the Xia Dynasty. Shun's capital was located in Puban, presently located in Shanxi).

Under Emperor Yao, Shun was appointed successively Minister of Instruction, General Regulator and chief of the Four Peaks, and put all affairs in proper order within three years. Yao was so impressed that he appointed Shun as his successor to the throne. Shun wished to decline in favour of someone more virtuous, but eventually assumed Yao's duties. It was said that "those who had to try a lawsuit did not go to Danzhu, but to Shun." Danzhu was the son of Yao.

After ascending to the throne, Shun offered sacrifices to the god Shang Di, as well as to the hills, rivers, and the host of spirits. Then he toured the eastern, the southern, the western, and the northern parts of the country; in each place he offered burnt-offering to Heaven at each of the four peaks (Mount Tai, Mount Huang, Mount Hua and Mount Heng), sacrificed to the hills and rivers, set in accord the seasons, months, and days, established uniform measurements of length and capacities, and reinforced ceremonial laws.

Shun divided the land into twelve provinces, raising altars upon twelve hills, and deepening the rivers. Shun dealt with Four Perils: banishing Gonggong to You Prefecture, confining Huan-dou(驩兜) on Mount Chong(宗山), executing or imprisoning Gun a prisoner till his death on Feather Mountain, and driving the San-Miao into San-Wei. Gun's son, Yu, was subsequently appointed  as minister of work(共工) to govern the water and the land. Later, Shun appointed Yu to be General Regulator (Prime Minister). Yu wished to decline in favour of the Minister of Agriculture, or Xie(契), or Gao Yao, but finally accepted upon Shun's insistence. Shun then appointed Chui(垂) as the new minister of work(共工). Shun also appointed Yi as Minister of Animal Husbandry to govern the beasts and trees of the land, Bo-yi as Priest of the Ancestral Temple to perform religious ceremonies, Hui as Director of Music, Long as Minister of Communications to counter deceptions and false reports.

According to the Canon of Shun, Shun began to reign at the age of 30, reigned with Yao for 30 years, and reigned 50 more years after Yao's abdication, then Shun died. The Bamboo Annals state that Yao chose Shun as his heir three years before abdicating the throne to him. Both sources agree that after abdicating, Yao lived for another 28 years in retirement during Shun's reign.

In later centuries, Yao and Shun were glorified for their virtue by Confucian philosophers. Shun was particularly renowned for his modesty and filial piety (xiao ).

Legends

Sima Qian claimed in Annals of the Five Emperors that Shun descended from the Yellow Emperor through the latter's grandson Emperor Zhuanxu. The Bamboo Annals (048) recorded the name of Shun's mother as Wodeng, and Shun's birthplace as Yaoxu. Wodeng died when Shun was very young. Shun's blind father Gusou (literally: "blind elder") remarried soon after Shun's mother's death.  Shun's stepmother then gave birth to Shun's half brother Xiang and a half-sister (Liènǚ Zhuàn, Ch. 1). Shun's stepmother and half brother treated Shun terribly, often forcing Shun to do all the hard work in the family and only giving him the worst food and clothing. Shun's father, being blind and elderly, was often ignorant of Shun's good deeds and always blamed Shun for everything. Yet, despite these conditions, Shun never complained and always treated his father, his stepmother, and his half brother with kindness and respect.

When he was barely an adult, his stepmother threw him out of the house. Shun was forced to live on his own. Yet, because of his compassionate nature and his natural leadership skills, everywhere he went, people followed him, and he was able to organize the people to be kind to each other and do the best they could. When Shun first went to a village that produced pottery, after less than one year, the pottery became more beautiful than they had ever been. When Shun went to a fishing village, the people there were at first fighting amongst themselves over the fishing grounds, and many people were injured or killed in the fights. Shun taught them how to share and allocate the fishing resources, and soon the village was prospering and all hostilities ceased.

When Emperor Yao became old, he became distressed over the fact that his 9 sons were all useless, only knew how to spend their days enjoying themselves with wine and song.  Yao asked his ministers, the Four Mountains, to propose a suitable successor. Yao then heard of Shun's tales. Wise Yao did not want to simply believe in the tales about Shun, so he decided to test Shun. Yao gave a district to Shun to govern and married his two daughters to him, with a small dowry of a new house and some money.

Though given an office and money, Shun still lived humbly. He continued to work in the fields every day. Shun even managed to convince his two brides, the two princesses, Yao's daughters, named Ehuang (Fairy Radiance) and Nüying (Maiden Bloom), who were used to good living, to live humbly and work along the people. However, Shun's stepmother and half brother became extremely jealous and conspired to kill Shun. Once Shun's half brother Xiang lit a barn on fire, and convinced Shun to climb onto the roof to put the fire out, but then Xiang took away the ladder, trapping Shun on the burning roof. Shun skilfully made a parachute out of his hat and cloth and jumped down in safety.  Another time, Xiang and his mother conspired to get Shun drunk and then throw him into a dried-up well and then bury him with rocks and dirt. Shun's half-sister, never approving of her mother and brother's schemes, told Shun's wives about the scheme. Shun thus prepared himself. Shun pretended to get drunk, and when he was thrown into the well, he had already a tunnel pre-dug to escape to the surface. Thus, Shun survived many attempts on his life. Yet, he never blamed his stepmother or his half brother, and forgave them every time.

Eventually, Shun's stepmother and half brother repented their past wrongs. Shun wholeheartedly forgave them both, and even helped Xiang get an office. Shun also managed to influence Emperor Yao's 9 worthless sons into becoming useful contributing members of society.

Emperor Yao was very impressed by all of Shun's achievements, and thus chose Shun as his successor and put him on the throne in the year of Jiwei. Yao's capital was in Ji which in modern times is also in Shanxi province.

Shun is also renowned as the originator of the music called Dashao, a symphony of nine Chinese musical instruments.

In the last year of Shun's reign, Shun decided to tour the country. But unfortunately, he died suddenly of an illness on the journey near the Xiang River. Both his wives rushed from home to his body, and wept by the river for days. Their tears turned into blood and stained the reeds by the river. From that day on, the bamboo of that region became red-spotted, which explains the origin of spotted bamboo. Then overcome by grief, both women threw themselves into the river and drowned.

Shun considered his son, Shangjun, as unworthy and picked Yu, the tamer of floods, as his heir.

Descendants 
Tradition has it that Chen are descendants of Emperor Shun. Gui Man, a descendant of Shun, became Chen Hugong, the founder of the State of Chen. Later Chen dynasty emperors such as Chen Baxian would also claim descent from Shun.

Hồ Quý Ly, the progenitor of the Hồ dynasty, would later claim descent from Duke Hu of Chen 陳胡公 (Hồ being the Sino-Vietnamese pronunciation of 胡 Hú) and thereby indirect descent from Shun. China's province of Zhejiang around the 940s was the origin of the Chinese Hồ/Hú family.

Tian (田) and  Yuan (袁) also claim descent from the State of Chen.

Alternative biography
It is thought by some scholars that Mencius asserted "Shun was an Eastern barbarian; he was born in Chu Feng, moved to Fu Hsia, and died in Ming T'iao and that emperor Yao came to his field's with oxs and married his daughters to him and appointed him and that he did not reign as emperor until after yao died because they cannot be two rulers. Additionally, the Bamboo Annals and Han Fei paint a very different picture of Shun. Both the Annals and the book Han Feizi stated that Shun overthrew Yao and left him in prison to die. Danzhu, Yao's son and rightful heir, was banished and later defeated in battle. In addition, Han Fei stated that Yu then rebelled and banished Shun. This account was referenced in Li Bai's poem "Distant Parting" (遠別離).

Han Fei also mentioned that Shun personally settled land and water disputes among farmers and fishermen by cohabitating with them.

Events of Shun's reign

In the 3rd year of his reign, he ordered Jiutao to establish penalties to deal with various criminals.
In the 9th year of his reign, the Queen Mother of the West came to worship in China and brought white jade rings and Jue (玦) as gifts.
In the 14th year of his reign, Yu of Xia was appointed to manage disasters caused by floods and winds.
In the 15th year of his reign, he appointed Houshi to build the palace.
In February of the 17th year, dancing was first taught at schools.
In the 25th year of his reign, envoy of the Xishen tribe came and, as gifts, brought the bow and arrow.
In the 29th year, he ordered Ziyi to serve as duke in Shang.
In the 30th year of his reign, his wife Mang died and was honored with a tomb built for her at Wei (渭).
In the 32nd year of his reign, he transferred military power to Yu of Xia.
In January of the 33rd year of his reign, he rewarded Yu of Xia for his achievement in managing the floods, in the aftermath of which, nine provinces were re-established in China.
In the 35th year of his reign, he ordered Yu of Xia to send troops to Youmiao. After Yu achieved victory, Youmiao sent an envoy with a request to join China.
In his 36th year of his reign, he ordered the Great Wall (of Shun's time, not the current Great Wall of China) to be torn down.
In the 42nd year of his reign, the Xuandu people came to worship him and brought precious jade as gifts.
The winter of the 47th year of his reign was very warm and the grass did not die.
In the 49th year of his reign, he moved to Mingtiao, a place later called Haizhou during the Warring States period. His death came the following year, after a rule described as having lasted fifty years.

See also

Cangwu County
Chen (surname)
Chinese mythology
Emperor Yao
Great Flood (China)
Imperial examination in Chinese mythology
Jiuyi Mountains
Xiang River
Xiang River goddesses
Yu the Great

Notes

References
"Canon of Shun", Classic of History, traditionally first compiled and edited by Confucius, in about Fifth to Sixth Century BC, in what is now China. Available at Wikisource in English and in Chinese.

External links
 Outlines of Early China History by Li Ung Bing

Three Sovereigns and Five Emperors
Twenty-four Filial Exemplars